Neverender 12% is an EP by rock group Coheed and Cambria, released in 2009. It is a Hot Topic exclusive; a preview of the band's Neverender: Children of The Fence Edition box set.  It is so named because it contains 12% of the songs that were released on the DVD box set.

Track listing

Personnel
Coheed and Cambria
Claudio Sanchez – lead vocals, rhythm guitar
Travis Stever – lead guitar, backing vocals
Michael Todd – bass, backing vocals
Chris Pennie – drums

2009 EPs
Coheed and Cambria albums
Columbia Records EPs